The New Richmond station is a closed railway station in New Richmond, Quebec, Canada. It served Via Rail's Montreal-Gaspé train until 2013, when the line was closed east of Matapédia station. The station was located on rue McCormick, and was staffed with limited wheelchair accessibility.

References

External links

Via Rail stations in Quebec
Railway stations in Gaspésie–Îles-de-la-Madeleine
Disused railway stations in Canada
Railway stations closed in 2013